Reprise Records is an American record label founded in 1960 by Frank Sinatra. It is owned by Warner Music Group, and operates through Warner Records, one of its flagship labels.

Artists currently signed to Reprise Records include Enya, Michael Bublé, Eric Clapton, Stevie Nicks, Neil Young, Deftones, Mastodon, Lindsey Buckingham, Josh Groban, Disturbed, Idina Menzel, My Chemical Romance, Gerard Way, Green Day, Dwight Yoakam, and Never Shout Never.

Company history

Beginnings

Reprise Records was formed in 1960 by Frank Sinatra in order to allow more artistic freedom for his own recordings. Soon thereafter, he garnered the nickname "The Chairman of the Board". Because of dissatisfaction with Capitol Records, and after trying to buy Norman Granz's Verve Records, the first album Sinatra released on Reprise was Ring-a-Ding-Ding! As CEO of Reprise, Sinatra recruited several artists for the fledgling label, such as fellow Rat Pack members Dean Martin and Sammy Davis, Jr. The original roster from 1961 to 1963 included Bing Crosby, Jo Stafford, Rosemary Clooney, Duke Ellington, Nancy Sinatra, Esquivel and stand-up comedian Redd Foxx. The original Reprise LP label had four different logos, depending on the genre: a riverboat for Pop records (pictured), a cherub for Jazz records, an owl for Spoken Word/Comedy records, and a picture of Sinatra for his records.

One of the label's founding principles under Sinatra's leadership was that each artist would have full creative freedom, and at some point complete ownership of their work, including publishing rights. This is the reason why recordings of early Reprise artists (Dean Martin, Jimi Hendrix, the Kinks, etc.) are (in most cases) currently distributed through other labels. In Martin's case, his Reprise recordings were out of print for nearly 20 years before a deal was struck with Capitol Records. Reprise continued to reissue the Sinatra catalog until 2013 when it was sold to Capitol.

Sale to Warner Bros.
In August 1963, as part of a film deal, Warner Bros. purchased Reprise (which had been losing money) from Frank Sinatra, who nonetheless retained a 1/3 interest in the label. Many of the older artists on the label were dropped by Warner Bros. Records. Reprise president Mo Ostin was retained as the head of the label and he went on to play a very significant role in the history of the Warner group of labels over the next four decades. Warner-Reprise executives began targeting younger acts, beginning by securing the American distribution rights to the Pye Records recordings by the Kinks in 1964. Reprise soon added teen-oriented pop acts like Dino, Desi & Billy to the roster. As well, Sinatra's own daughter Nancy (who began recording for the label in 1961) was retained by Ostin, becoming a major pop star from late 1965. The label moved almost exclusively to rock-oriented music in the late 1960s, although Frank Sinatra continued to record for the label until the 1980s.

Through direct signings or distribution deals, by the 1970s the Reprise roster grew to include Lee Hazlewood, Jill Jackson, Jimi Hendrix, the early Joni Mitchell recordings, Neil Young, the Electric Prunes, Donna Loren, Arlo Guthrie, Norman Greenbaum, Tom Lehrer, Kenny Rogers and The First Edition, Tiny Tim, Ry Cooder, Captain Beefheart, John Sebastian, Family, the early 1970s recordings by Frank Zappa and the Mothers, Gram Parsons, Emmylou Harris, Nico's Desertshore, the Fugs, Jethro Tull, Pentangle, T. Rex, the Meters, John Cale, Gordon Lightfoot, Michael Franks, Richard Pryor, Al Jarreau, Fleetwood Mac, Fanny, and the Beach Boys.

Dormancy

In 1976, the Reprise label was deactivated by Warner Bros. and all of its roster (except Frank Sinatra and Neil Young) was moved to the main Warner Bros. label. Although older catalog albums continued to be manufactured with the Reprise logo, and albums by the Beach Boys on Brother Records were issued in the Reprise catalog numbering sequence, aside from Sinatra and Young (and the Sylvia Syms album Syms by Sinatra, which Sinatra conducted and co-produced) there were no new releases on Reprise for several years.

Revival and Reprise today (1985–present)
In late 1985, some copies of the Dream Academy's hit single "Life in a Northern Town" were pressed on the Warner Bros. label bearing the Reprise logo. 1986 saw releases bearing Reprise labels from the Dream Academy as well as Dwight Yoakam. In summer 1987, Warner Bros. Records chairman Mo Ostin and label president Lenny Waronker officially announced the reactivation of Reprise, including its own separate promotions department, and former Warner Bros. Vice President of Promotion Rich Fitzgerald was appointed as label vice president. In the time since, Warner Bros. has often elevated the stature of Reprise to the rank of secondary parent label, as many of its subsidiary labels (such as Straight and Kinetic) have had their records released in conjunction with Reprise.

As of 2017, it is home to such artists as Enya, Michael Bublé, Eric Clapton, Green Day, Stevie Nicks, Neil Young, Deftones, Josh Groban, Disturbed, Idina Menzel, Tom Petty and the Heartbreakers, Gerard Way and Never Shout Never.

It was formerly home to Jimi Hendrix and the Barenaked Ladies' catalogs in the U.S. When the Bee Gees back catalog was remastered by Rhino Records in the 2000s, their CDs were issued under the Reprise label (they appeared on sister labels Atco and Warner Bros. in the past).

Neil Young stated in a documentary about his life that Charles Manson was turned down by Reprise.

In 2010, Reprise opened a country music division, operating as part of Warner Music Group Nashville, featuring Blake Shelton, the JaneDear Girls, Michelle Branch and Frankie Ballard as part of its roster.

In September 2011, several layoffs took place at Reprise Records and other Warner labels.

In 2017, Reprise released Enya's albums on vinyl. Some of them were pressed on this format for the first time.

Reprise Records artists

Labels
 143 Records (1999–2001)
 Bizarre Records (1968–1972)
 Big Brother Records (2008–present)
 BME Recordings (2004–present)
 Brother Records (1970-1977)
 Chrysalis Records (1969–1972)
 Cold Chillin' Records (1988–1993; select releases)
 DiscReet Records (1973–1979)
 Elementree Records (1995–2000)
 Giant Records (1990–2001; select releases)
 Grand Jury Records (1990–1993)
 In Bloom Records (1998–2000)
 Kinetic Records (1992–2000)
 Straight Records (1968–1972)
 Sire Records (1977–2000: select releases)
 Vapor Records (1995–present; current status unknown)

Parent organizations
(1960–1968) Independent
(1968–1969) Warner Bros.-Seven Arts
(1969–1972) Kinney National Company
(1972–1990) Warner Communications
(1990–2001) WarnerMedia
(2001–2003) AOL Time Warner
(2004–present) Warner Music Group

See also
 List of record labels
 Warner Records

Notes

References

External links
 
 A discography of American Reprise singles from 1961 to 1970

 
American record labels
Frank Sinatra
Jazz record labels
Labels distributed by Warner Music Group
Pop record labels
Record labels established in 1960
Record labels disestablished in 1976
Record labels established in 1987
Re-established companies
Rock record labels
Soundtrack record labels
Warner Records
Warner Music labels
Vanity record labels
1960 establishments in the United States
1963 mergers and acquisitions